Future Gamer was an online video games e-zine created by Future Publishing.

History 
Future Gamer was launched in 1998 with Andy Smith as editor. FG as it became known to fans, was the world's first e-mail deliverable gaming magazine. 

This business model was unsuccessful. FG ran for about 18 months before finally being reshaped into the UK version of Daily Radar, later GamesRadar.

Staff 
Amongst others:
 Andy Smith (Editor)
 Steve Bradley (Deputy Editor)
 Andy Ashwin
 Mark Eveleigh
 Alan Jarvie
 Amazing Bryan

Community 
FG spawned a close online community through its newsgroup. This included a Half Life clan ([FGC]_) that was featured in a subsequent advertising campaign.

Despite community pressure, at 00:00 on 23 May 2001 Future Publishing shut down their News Server in favour of Internet forums. This, along with the demise of the original magazine, led to the FG community seeking out a new home. It has endured to this day through a variety of newsgroups and is currently situated at vgj.forum on nntp.cheeseorsausage.com and at cheese or sausage.

References

External links 
 Interview with Andy Smith

Magazines established in 1998
Defunct British websites
Online magazines published in the United Kingdom
Video game websites
Magazines disestablished in 1999
Defunct computer magazines published in the United Kingdom